Kumara Chokshananda Sangakkara (born 27 October 1977) is a Sri Lankan retired professional cricketer and current commentator. A former captain of the Sri Lanka national cricket team in all formats, an ICC Hall of Fame inductee and former president of the MCC, he is widely regarded as one of the greatest wicket-keeper-batsmen ever. Sangakkara was officially rated in the top three current batsmen in the world in all three formats of the game at various stages of his career. He is the current coach of Rajasthan Royals IPL team. Sangakkara scored 28,016 runs in international cricket across all formats in a career that spanned 15 years. At retirement, he was the second-highest run-scorer in ODI cricket, next only to Sachin Tendulkar, and the sixth-highest run scorer in Test cricket.

As a player, Sangakkara was a left-handed top-order brilliant batsman and was also a wicket-keeper for a large proportion of his career. Sangakkara holds many Test records, having been the fastest, or joint-fastest (in terms of innings) to various run milestones in Test cricket. Sangakkara's partnership with Mahela Jayawardene was the second most prolific in the history of Test cricket. Additionally, he holds the record for the most wicket keeping dismissals in ODI cricket.

Sangakkara won the ICC Cricketer of the Year in 2012 and won many other awards for both Test and ODI cricket. He was selected as Leading Cricketer in the World in the 2012 and 2015 editions of Wisden Cricketers' Almanack, becoming the second player to have won this award twice. Sangakkara was rated as the Greatest ODI player of all time in a public poll conducted by Cricket Australia in 2016.
He won the Man of the Match in the finals of the 2014 ICC World Twenty20 tournament and was part of the team that made the final of the 2007 Cricket World Cup, 2011 Cricket World Cup, 2009 ICC World Twenty20 and 2012 ICC World Twenty20. He won the Man of the Match award in the final of the 2014 ICC World Twenty20, where he helped Sri Lanka win their first title.

In 2019, he was appointed President of the MCC, the first non-British person to be appointed to the position since the club was founded in 1787. He was the youngest person and the first active international player to deliver the MCC Spirit of Cricket Cowdrey Lecture, which was widely praised by the cricketing community for its outspoken nature. In June 2021, he was inducted to the ICC Cricket Hall of Fame and became the second Sri Lankan to be inducted into the ICC Hall of Fame after Muttiah Muralitharan.

Early life
Sangakkara was born in Matale, Central Province, near the city of Kandy, in 1977. He grew up in Kandy with three siblings and his parents.

Sangakkara received his education at Trinity College, Kandy. During his school days, he was a chorister and played the violin.

Sangakkara excelled in many sports, and his college principal encouraged him to focus on cricket. He represented his school's Under-13, Under-15, Under-17, Under-19 and first XI squads and was awarded his school's The Trinity Lion award and Ryde Gold Medal. He got selected to represent Sri Lanka A cricket team's tour to South Africa in 1999–00. His knock of an unbeaten 156 against the  Zimbabwe A team during a one-day match helped him secure a place in the Sri Lankan national cricket team later that year.

Sanga was the Senior Prefect (Head Boy) of school and entered the Law Faculty of the University of Colombo, but he was unable to finish his degree initially due to his cricketing commitments. He later completed his master's degree in law from the university.

His parents sheltered Tamil families during the Black July riots in 1983.

International career

Early career
At the age of 22, Sangakkara made his Test debut on 20 July 2000, in the first of three-match series against South Africa. Sri Lanka won the match and in his side's only innings Sangakakra batted at the fall of the third wicket and scored 23 runs before he was dismissed leg before wicket by spin bowler Nicky Boje. He had made his ODI debut 2 weeks earlier, scoring 35 before being run out in his One-day cricket debut against Pakistan. He then received his first man of the match award in the 2nd match of the Singer Triangular Series, 2000, scoring 85 runs against South Africa. He ended the series with 199 runs, at an average of 66.33, securing his place for the upcoming Test series against South Africa. Before reaching his first Test century, he was twice dismissed in the 90s, once against each of South Africa and England. In August 2001, India toured Sri Lanka for three Tests and in the opening match Sangakkara scored his first century. His innings of 105 not out at number three helped set up a ten-wicket victory for Sri Lanka. Later that year Sangakkara scored his second Test century, this time in the first of three matches against the touring West Indians.

He scored his first double-century against Pakistan in 2002, at the 2nd Asian Test Championship final. His performance helped Sri Lanka secure the Test championship. In April 2003, Sangakkara made his first ODI century against Pakistan, in a losing effort. Together with Marvan Atapattu, he made a partnership of 438 for the 2nd wicket—4th highest in the world—against Zimbabwe in 2004. In that game, he scored 270, his first 250+ score. In July 2005, he was selected to the ICC World XI ODI team but missed out from its Test counterpart.

Vice-captaincy
When Sri Lanka toured Bangladesh in February 2006 regular captain Marvan Atapattu was injured and Mahela Jayawardene became captain while Sangakkara was made vice-captain. Pakistan toured Sri Lanka for two Test and three ODIs in March 2006, and with Atapattu still injured Jayawardene and Sangakkara remained captain and vice-captain respectively. The pair had only expected to hold the positions on an interim basis, but extended into a third series as Atapattu failed to recover in time to tour England in April and ended up filling the roles full-time. In July 2006, Sangakkara made his second-highest Test score to-date (287) against South Africa. In a record-breaking partnership with Mahela Jayawardene, he set up the world record for the highest partnership in Test cricket—624 runs—in this match.

On 6 December 2007 he made it to the top spot of ICC Test player rankings with a rating of 938, the highest rating ever achieved by a Sri Lankan player, and became the first batsman ever to score in excess of 150 in four consecutive tests. His skill was recognised worldwide when he earned selection for the ICC World XI One-Day International team that competed against Australia in the Johnnie Walker Series in October 2005. Despite the World XI losing all of the one-day games by considerable margins, Sangakkara left the series with some credit, averaging 46. He was one of the winners of the 2008 inaugural Cricinfo awards for outstanding batting in Test cricket. He was once again named in the World Test XI by the ICC in 2010.

Sangakkara holds the record for being the fastest man to 8,000, 9,000, 10,000 (jointly held), 11,000 and 12,000 runs in Test cricket. During Sri Lanka's tour to England in May 2006, he was named the vice-captain of the side. On 3 March 2009, a terrorist attack on the Sri Lankan team convoy in Pakistan injured 6 Sri Lankan players including Sangakkara. Sangakkara suffered shrapnel wounds in his shoulder. In November 2006, Sangakkara was included in the ICC World XI Test team. Next year, he signed an agreement to join Warwickshire County Cricket Club. That year, he scored back-to-back double centuries in Tests and became only the fifth cricketer in the history to do so.

Captaincy

In February 2009, the then captain of the Sri Lankan side, Mahela Jayawardene announced that he would step down from captaincy "in the best interests of the Sri Lankan team". He said he believed that it would give his successor around two years to build up to the 2011 Cricket World Cup. Therefore, at the age of 31 and with the experience of 80 Tests and 246 ODIs, Sangakkara succeeded Jayawardene as Sri Lanka's captain in all formats of the game. His first engagement in the role was the 2009 ICC World Twenty20 hosted by England in June. Sri Lanka became runners-up in the series after winning all the game in group and knock-out stages and being defeated by Pakistan in the final. Sangakkara made 64 not-out in the final, but was unable to take Sri Lanka for the championship. He was named in the 'Team of the Tournament' by Cricinfo for the 2009 T20I World Cup.

Sri Lanka failed to reach to the knock-out stage of the ICC Champions Trophy in September 2009. The next Indian tour proved to be disastrous for the team, with Sri Lanka being beaten by India in Test series 2–0 and ODI series 3–1.

Sri Lankan team under the captaincy of Sangakkara gained momentum and won the next Tri-series in Bangladesh, Zimbabwe and Sri Lanka, beating India as well. The Sri Lankans' tour of Australia proved to be very successful, in winning both the T20 and ODI series. This was Sri Lanka's first ever series victory in Australia.

A month in advance of the 2011 World Cup in March, Sangakkara decided that he would resign the captaincy after the tournament. Sri Lanka reached the final of the tournament. Throughout the tournament Sangakkara was in prolific form with the bat scoring 465 runs from 9 matches and was the third highest run-scorer behind teammate Tillakaratne Dilshan and India's Sachin Tendulkar. He was named as captain and wicket keeper of the 'Team of the Tournament' for the 2011 World Cup by the ICC. He was also named in the 'Team of the Tournament' by Cricinfo. During the final, loud crowd noise prevented match referee Jeff Crowe from hearing Sri Lankan captain Sangakkara's call as the coin was tossed by Indian captain Dhoni. The toss had to be redone – an extremely unusual event, especially at as prominent an event as the World Cup final. He also criticised the decision of ICC in its attempt to tweak and alter the 2.5-metre rule while a tournament was in progress.

Days after guiding Sri Lanka to the finals of the World Cup, Sangakkara announced to the public he was stepping down as captain of the T20 and ODI teams. He offered to continue as Test captain if deemed necessary for transition to new skipper, but Dilshan was appointed captain across all formats. Reflecting on the decision afterwards, he said that "captaining Sri Lanka is a job that ages you very quickly ... It's rarely a job you will last long in ... I also had a two-year stint, and I enjoyed it at times, certainly on the field where our results showed we were one of the top two sides in the world for one-and-a-half years, especially in the shorter form of the game."

The same year, he was named the ODI Cricketer of the Year at the ICC awards ceremony. In 2012, he was honored as one of the Wisden Cricketers of the Year.

Post-captaincy

Sri Lanka's first fixture after the World Cup was a Sri Lanka tour of England in 2011 beginning in May. During the second match of a three Test series Tillakaratne Dilshan, Sangakkara's successor as captain, suffered a broken thumb. Sangakkara filled in while Dilshan was off the pitch and formally assumed the captaincy for the final Test. The match ended in a draw and the series ended in a 1–0 victory for England; Sangakarra scored a century in the match, his first against England in nine Tests.

Sangakkara was named the man of the series in Test series with Pakistan in 2011/12—his first man of the series award in Test cricket. He made 516 runs in the 3 match series which was won by Pakistan 1–0. On August in 2013, he was named the ODI Cricketer of the Year, wicket keeper-captain of the ICC World XI Test team, and won the ICC People's Choice Award in 2011 ICC Awards. In 2012, he was named one of the Wisden's five Cricketers of the Year. He was also named as captain and wicket keeper of the 2011 World Test XI by the ICC and named in the 2012 World Test XI and ODI XI.

Sangakkara struggled with his form when England toured Sri Lanka in 2012. He failed to score a half century during The Two Test match series. But he regained his form in the ODI series against Pakistan where his batting score reached the 90s. In the Test series that followed, Sangakkara continued his form with a 199, the scoreboard originally said he had scored the double century but it turned out to be a mistake. Sri Lanka later won the Test match. He followed this up with 192 in the same game, again missing out on the double century. The next two matches were drawn, which meant Sri Lanka won the series 1–0. This was their first time winning a Test series since the retirement of Muttiah Muralitharan.

On the Sri Lankan tour of Bangladesh in 2014, Sangakkara hit his highest test score to date with 319 in the first innings of the second test. Making him only the third Sri Lankan player to hit a triple century after Sanath Jayasuria and Mahela Jayawardena. He followed his triple century with a knock of 105 in the 2nd innings and the game finished as a draw. He continued his good batting run with another century in the 2nd ODI.

Along with teammate Mahela Jayawardene, he recorded the most partnership runs for the 3rd wicket in Test history, scoring 5890 runs surpassing the 5826 runs of Rahul Dravid and Sachin Tendulkar, during the first Test match against Pakistan at Galle International Stadium. The two also hold the record for the highest partnership for any wicket in Test matches, scoring 624 runs for the 3rd wicket against South Africa in July 2006. This still stands as the largest partnership for any wicket in first-class cricket, anywhere.

His impressive form with the bat continued at the 2014 Asia Cup where he amassed a total of 245 runs in five innings. He started the tournament with a 63 against Pakistan before hitting a match winning 103 against India. He then added scores of 77 and 2 against Afghanistan and Bangladesh before being dismissed for a golden duck in the final against Pakistan. Sri Lanka went on to win the game and the tournament.

Sangakkara decided to retire from T20 internationals after playing the 2014 ICC World Twenty20. Afterwards, Jayawardene also followed him into retirement. Sangakkara under-performed in the World T20, but in the final match against India, he scored 51 not out off just 33 balls making his team win their second ICC trophy since 1996.

Sri Lanka played their first 7-match ODI series at home, against England, from 26 November to 16 December 2014. On 3 December 2014 Sangakkara reached 13,000 runs in One-day internationals in the third match of the series at the Mahinda Rajapaksa International Stadium, Hambantota, and became the fourth player in One-day history to achieve the feat after Sachin Tendulkar, Ricky Ponting, and Sanath Jayasuriya. He also became the second most prolific half-century maker in One-day internationals during this match. He scored 4 consecutive half-centuries followed by a century. On 13 December 2014, he scored his 20th ODI century, becoming the second Sri Lankan to score 20 ODI centuries, after 28 by Sanath Jayasuriya, and 9th overall to do so. He also took 4 catches as a wicket-keeper in this match taking the player of the match award. This match was his last match in his hometown due to his retirement from the ODI arena after the 2015 Cricket World Cup.

His last One-day innings in Sri Lanka was played on 13 December 2014 in the last match of the England ODI series. He was caught while on 33 in his last innings on home soil. 

On 4 January 2015, Sangakkara scored his 38th test century by making 203 against New Zealand during the second match of the 2 Test match series. With this feat, he is only one short to become the highest double-century maker in test history. He has 11 test double centuries, only one short of 12 double centuries by Don Bradman. He also surpassed 12,000 runs in Test cricket, becoming the first Sri Lankan and 5th overall cricketer to achieve that mark.

On 14 February 2015, Sangakkara became the second highest run scorer in One-Day International history, by surpassing Australian Ricky Ponting. He achieved this milestone during the first match of 2015 ICC Cricket World Cup against New Zealand, but Sri Lanka lost the match.

On 26 February 2015 in 2015 ICC Cricket World Cup against Bangladesh, Sangakkara scored his 22nd ODI century in his 400th appearance in One-Day Internationals. The 210* second wicket partnership between Sangakkara and Tillakaratne Dilshan on that day was broken again on 1 March 2015, in the next group match in World Cup against England, where Sangakkara joined Lahiru Thirimanne with 212* for the second wicket. Sangakkara scored his 23rd century in this match and this 70-ball century was his fastest century overall and the fastest century by a Sri Lankan in World Cup history.

During the same World Cup, against Australia, when chasing a massive score of 377, Sangakkara passed 14,000 ODI runs, becoming the first Sri Lankan and second overall cricketer to pass it. He scored 124 runs in the next match against Scotland, becoming first batsman in World Cup history to score 4 consecutive hundreds.

Sangakkara's last ODI innings were disappointing from him and his teams' point of view, where Sri Lanka lost the quarter-final against South Africa on 18 March 2015. He only scored 45 runs, it was Sri Lanka's first World Cup defeat in a quarter final after 1999. His teammate Mahela also retired from ODI career with this match. He was named in the 'Team of the Tournament' for the 2015 World Cup by the ICC.

Retirement
During the 2014 ICC World Twenty20 championship, Sangakkara announced his retirement from the Twenty20 International arena after the championship with his teammate Mahela Jayawardene. In December 2014, he announced that he would also retire from ODI cricket after the 2015 Cricket World Cup, again with Jayawardene. As he said, he retired from T20I cricket in April 2014 and from ODI cricket on 18 March 2015.

On 1 April 2015, Sri Lanka's Sports Minister Navin Dissanayake stated that Sangakkara should reconsider his intention to retire in August 2015. He said that Sangakkara was disillusioned by some of the actions of the Sri Lanka Cricket Board in the past, and now that attempts have been made to change personnel and practices, Sangakkara should reconsider his decision. Sangakkara did not give an answer to the statement.

On 27 June 2015, Sangakkara officially announced his retirement from Test cricket as well. He retired from Test cricket after the second Test match against India. He scored 32 runs in the first innings and 18 in the second of his last test match and got out to Ravichandran Ashwin for the fourth consecutive time in the series.
The P Sara Oval ground was decorated with numerous banners and posters of Sangakkara with messages such as "Thank You Sanga" and "Class Never Retires". His teammates including Mahela, Thilan Thushara, and Sanath Jayasuriya, Murali came to the ground to bid farewell to Sangakkara. Sri Lanka Rupavahini Corporation recognized Sangakkara as the "Player of the Century" citing many of Sangakkara's memories and achievements.

After the conclusion of the second test, a special farewell presentation was held for Sangakkara with the presence of President Maithreepala Sirisena, Prime Minister Ranil Wickramasinghe, former Sri Lankan Test captain Arjuna Ranatunga, former Indian Test captain Sunil Gavaskar, and several cricket celebrities. Several mementos were given for the behalf of his cricket career and Gavaskar invited him to the former cricketer's club. Indian captain Virat Kohli described Sangakkara as "a lovely person". President Sirisena offered him to work as the Commissioner for the United Kingdom in Sri Lanka stating "He has been a great face for our country and it gives me immense pleasure in offering him the post of High Commissioner to the UK".

In November 2020, Sangakkara was nominated for the Sir Garfield Sobers Award for ICC Male Cricketer of the Decade, and the award for ODI cricketer of the decade.

Cowdrey Lecture
Sangakkara delivered the 2011 Marylebone Cricket Club (MCC) Spirit of Cricket Cowdrey Lecture at Lords. He became the youngest person and the first active international player to deliver that lecture, which was widely praised by the cricketing community. The one-hour-long speech was based on the history and the corruption in the cricket administration in Sri Lanka. In his speech, he said: "accountability and transparency in administration and credibility of conduct were lost in a mad power struggle that would leave Sri Lankan cricket with no clear, consistent administration", and observed that these problems in administration had risen only after Sri Lanka's 1996 Cricket World Cup victory. He also blamed "a handful of well-meaning individuals" who control the game, wasting the cricket board's finances and resources. Immediately after the lecture, the Sri Lankan sports minister Mahindananda Aluthgamage ordered an investigation into the speech. Despite the critical comments by the Sri Lankan government officials, it has been described as "the most important speech in cricket history".

Beyond playing cricket
Sangakkara retired from ODI cricket in 2015.
On 19 August 2015, just after the end of Sri Lankan Parliamentary election of 2015, president Maithripala Sirisena appointed Sangakkara as the Ambassador Of Anti-narcotics program In Sri Lanka. The letter of appointment was handed over to Sangakkara by the president at President's official residence.

In January 2019, Sangakkara accepted an invitation from the incumbent President of the MCC Anthony Wreford to be his successor. The decision was announced on 1 May 2019, at which time Sangakkara became the President Designate. His one-year term began on 1 October 2019. Sangakkara was the first non-British MCC President since the club was founded in 1787.  The MCC are the custodians of the Laws of Cricket, which are applied by the International Cricket Council in its role as the global governing body for the game.  Sangakkara was awarded honorary life membership of the MCC in 2012 and joined its world cricket committee the same year. Sangakkara described the MCC as "the greatest cricket club in the world" and described being named as its president as a "huge honour". Kumar Sangakkara has become the first non-British President of Marylebone Cricket Club (MCC), with effect from 1 October 2019 for a period of one year which was extended for further one year till October 2021 due to the COVID-19 pandemic. He said, "I am thrilled to hold the prestigious position of MCC President and I look forward to working hard with the MCC to build on this incredible year of cricket. We have the opportunity to convert more supporters to the game we love and educate them about the fantastic work MCC does locally, nationally and globally for cricket and those communities." 
Sangakkara has a long association with MCC. He played against the Club in 2002, opening the batting for the touring Sri Lankans in a first-class match at Queen's Park Chesterfield.

Domestic cricket
Sangakkara used to play domestic cricket for Nondescripts in Sri Lanka, as well as Surrey in England and also various T20 tournaments around the world. He made his Twenty20 debut on 17 August 2004, for Nondescripts Cricket Club in the 2004 SLC Twenty20 Tournament. He currently only plays for the MCC as a player-president in T20s.

County cricket
Sangakkara has played English county cricket with Warwickshire in the 2007 County Championship. In 2010, Sangakkara was contracted to represent Lancashire in the 2010 County Championship, but never represented the club because of international commitments. For the 2015 and 2016 seasons Sangakkara was contracted to play for Surrey. After his international retirement, Sangakkara continued to play for Surrey and in 2017 scored his 100th century in all formats of the game combined on 13 June 2017.

Indian Premier League
Sangakkara has played in five seasons of the Indian Premier League. Winning bids for him in 2008 and 2011 were US$700,000 by Kings XI Punjab and US$300,000 by Deccan Chargers, respectively. He was the captain of the Sunrisers Hyderabad team. Sangakkara has scored 1567 runs with 10 half-centuries in 62 matches in IPL.

In January 2021, Sangakkara was named the director of cricket of Rajasthan Royals ahead of the IPL 2021.

Sri Lanka Premier League 
In the Sri Lanka Premier League which officially started in 2012, Sangakkara was named the captain and icon player of the Kandurata Warriors franchise. Unfortunately, he couldn't participate as a player in the inaugural edition in 2012 as he suffered a finger injury weeks before the tournament during a One Day International against India. However, he appeared as a television commentator during some matches.

Caribbean Premier League
On 18 August 2013, Sangakkarra joined the Jamaica Tallawahs of the Caribbean Premier League.

Bangladesh Premier League 
In 2015, he was signed by Dhaka Dynamites for the 2015–16 Bangladesh Premier League. He was the leading run scorer of that season, scoring 349 runs in 10 matches. He was retained by Dhaka Dynamites for the 2016–17 Bangladesh Premier League.

Pakistan Super League 
In 2015, Sangakkara joined the Quetta Gladiators of the Pakistan Super League. He was later released by the franchise and was picked by Karachi Kings as captain for the 2017 edition. Under his captaincy team reached play-offs. The following year, in the 3rd edition of PSL, Sangakkara was picked by Multan Sultans.

Return to county cricket
Before Sri Lanka's Test series against England in 2014, Sangakkara returned to county cricket, playing two matches for Durham, which included 159 against Sussex in his final innings. On 16 January 2015, it was announced that he would be joining Surrey on a two-year contract. Sangakkara scored a brilliant century against Glamorgan, where he scored 149 runs, which was his maiden century for Surrey in this county season. After the match, he said that he was willing to see the comeback of English batsman Kevin Pietersen to international cricket.

Sangakkara represented Surrey from 2015 till 2017, helping them win Division Two of LV= 2015 County Championship and gaining promotion to Division One for the Specsavers 2016 County Championship season. Surrey also reached the finals of 2015 Royal London One-Day Cup before losing by six runs to Gloucestershire.

On 22 May 2017, Sangakkara announced that the following season would be his last in first-class cricket. He made the announcement after scoring four consecutive centuries becoming the fourth Surrey batsman to achieve this feat (Ian Ward was the last to do it in 2002), pass 20,000 first-class and having scored 592 runs in the said four games. He scored the fifth consecutive century on 26 May against Essex at the County Cricket Ground, Chelmsford. becoming only the eighth player to achieve this feat. In the quarter-final of the Royal London One-Day Cup against Yorkshire, he scored 121 from as many balls, which became his 100th century in all formats of the game combined, that now included 61 in first-class and 39 in List A games. Sangakkara became the first batsman to reach 1,000 runs for the season when he brought up his sixth century for the season against Yorkshire.

MCC

On the 2020 MCC tour of Pakistan, with all matches played in Lahore, Sangakkara played in all matches, registering 25 runs in the first T20 match with 1 catch behind the stumps, 3 runs in the only LA game (where he did not keep wicket), 1 catch behind the stumps and 10 with the bat in the second T20,  and 52 and 1 catch keeping wicket in the third and tour-ending T20,  giving him a total of 3 dismissals credited to his name and 90 runs in total on the tour, giving him a T20 average of 30 and a tour average of 22.5.

Cricket All-Stars Series
Sangakkara, though retired from international cricket, participated in the 2015 Cricket All-Stars Series for Warne's Warriors under Shane Warne's captaincy. In the three T20 matches, he scored 153 runs, more than any other cricketer in the series, and included one fifty. His average in the series was 51.00. He also hit the most fours and sixes, 12 apiece. For his overall performance, Sangakkara was judged player of the series.

Masters Champion League
Sangakkara also played for Gemini Arabians in the first edition of Masters Champions League T20 tournament which took place in the UAE. In the first match against Gemini and Libra Legends, Sangakkara scored 86 runs from just 43 balls and helped the team post a huge total of 234 runs in their allotted 20 overs. Libra Legends only scored 156 in their 20 overs and thus Gemini Arabians won the match courtesy of Sangakkara's knock. Sangakkara was also awarded man of the match. Sangakkara scored four consecutive fifties (65, 51, 51, 62) in the other matches played during the series, this secured a place in the final for the Arabians. In the final against Leo Lions, he scored 30 runs to become top run scorer of the series. His team won the series and remained undefeated throughout the tournament. Sangakkara won player of the series for his 386 runs with 5 fifties.

Selection committee
On 7 March 2016, Sangakkara was appointed as a member of Sri Lanka's selection committee by sports minister Dayasiri Jayasekara. The committee was tasked to select the Sri Lankan squad for 2016 ICC World Twenty20 tournament, as Sri Lanka suffered heavy defeats in recent times with the previous squad. The chairman of the selection committee is Aravinda de Silva. The other members are Romesh Kaluwitharana, Ranjith Madurasinghe, and Lalith Kaluperuma.

On August 20, 2020, Sangakkara was appointed as a member of the National Sports Council under the overview of Cabinet Minister of Sports and Youth Affairs Namal Rajapakse. The council is headed by his teammate Mahela Jayawardena and includes notable sporting personalities such as Dilantha Malagamuwa and Julian Bolling. In 2021, he was appointed as one of the members in the selection committee and technical advisory committee panel of Sri Lanka Cricket led by Aravinda de Silva.

Coaching career
He was appointed as Director of cricket for Rajasthan Royals in January, 2021.

Personal life
Sangakkara is married to his longtime partner, Yehali with whom he has twin children, a daughter Swyree and a son Kavith. Sangakkara converted to Christianity after his marriage to Yehali and Yehali has openly credited God for Kumar's career success.

Sangakkara is involved in charity work in Sri Lanka. He is a member of the Think Wise Initiative, launched by International Cricket Council, Joint United Nations Programme on HIV/AIDS and UNICEF, this initiative is aimed at raising awareness of HIV prevention and eliminating discrimination against people living with HIV and AIDS. He is also a partner of the Foundation of Goodness, a charity launched by Kushil Gunasekara.

In December 2011, Sangakkara collaborated with Mahela Jayawardene and veteran chef Dharshan Munidasa to open the Ministry of Crab which later went to become one of the top performing restaurants in Sri Lanka. He is also a partner in the local private equity firm Atman Group, and he has made substantial investments in the Sri Lankan economy post-war..

Playing style
Sangakkara is a left-handed top order batsman who likes to hit the ball square of the stumps on the off-side. While the cut and the pull are natural strokes for him, he tends to play off the front foot. The cover drive is one of his regular scoring shots. Sangakkara averaged 57.40 in Test cricket. In ODI cricket, he retired with an average of 42. Sangakkara handed his wicket-keeping duties in Test cricket to Prasanna Jayawardene in 2006. He played as a specialist batsman in Tests, and retired as a wicket keeper-batsman in other formats of the game. He is the first on the list of wicket keepers who contributed to the most dismissals in ODI cricket, with 499. He is also the wicket keeper with the second highest number of stumpings—99—in ODI cricket after Mahendra Singh Dhoni surpassed him.

Sangakkara has won a certain degree of admiration for his clever use of sledging and is one of the few cricketers who are willing to talk about it openly. In an interview in 2004 he explained his approach to sledging:

Commentary career 
Kumar Sangakkara made his ICC TV commentary debut during the 2017 ICC Champions Trophy along with newcomers Brendon McCullum, Graeme Smith and Ricky Ponting. Sangakkara was also one of the commentators for the global broadcast of the ICC Cricket World Cup in 2019.

Kumar Sangakkara has joined SkySports for commentary throughout the English summer of 2018. He also commentated in Pakistan's tour of England as well as India's tour of England.

Sangakkara is also a part of the IPL commentary panel in 2019 as well as in the 2020 edition that was taking place in the UAE.

International records

NOTE: World records are bold

Tests
 Sixth highest aggregate of runs (12,400) in 134 matches at an Average of 57.40
 Second most double centuries in a career – Sangakkara has 11 double centuries in Tests, second only to 12 by Don Bradman.
 Fourth highest number of centuries – Sangakkara has 38 centuries in 134 matches.
 Highest average (qualification 5000 runs.) by a Sri Lankan – Sangakkara (57.40)- fifth highest overall after Donald Bradman, Ken Barrington, Wally Hammond and Garfield Sobers.
 Half centuries – Sangakkara has 52 half-centuries in 134 matches. He is ninth in the list.
 First player to score 150+ scores in four consecutive Test matches.
 Fastest 8,000 runs – Sangakkara (152 innings)
 Fastest 9,000 runs – Sangakkara (172 innings)
 Joint fastest to 10,000 runs – Sangakkara along with Brian Lara and Sachin Tendulkar (195 innings)
 Fastest 11,000 runs – Sangakkara (208 innings)
 Fastest 12,000 runs – Sangakkara (224 innings)
 Highest partnership for any wicket – 624 for the third wicket by Kumara Sangakkara (287) & Mahela Jayawardene (374) against South Africa in 2006. This pair is the only on to score a 600+ partnership for any wicket in first-class history
 Most partnership runs – Kumara Sangakkara and Mahela Jayawardene scored 6554 runs together, which is the second highest by any partnership.
 Most runs in Year 2014 – 1493 runs in 12 matches with 4 hundreds and 9 fifties with average 71.09
 Most test centuries when batting at number 3 position(37)
 Most career runs when batting at number 3 position in test history(11679)

One-Day Internationals
 Aggregate runs (14,234 in 404 matches at an Average of 41.98) – Sangakkara is second on the list.
 First Sri Lankan to pass 14,000 runs.
 Most half centuries – Sangakkara has 93 half-centuries in 404 matches. He is second in the list.
 Most dismissals (includes wicket-keeping) – Sangakkara has taken (482 dismissals = 383 ct. + 99 st.) in 404 matches.
 Second most stumpings in a career as a wicketkeeper in ODIs – 99 by Sangakkara.
 Most runs in Year 2014 – 1256 runs in 28 matches with 4 hundreds and 8 fifties with the average 46.51
 First and only batsman to score four consecutive hundreds – centuries against Bangladesh (105*), England (117*), Australia (104) and Scotland (124) in the 2015 ICC World Cup.
 Sangakkara was the first Sri Lankan and 4th overall batsman to reach List of cricketers who scored a century in their hundred in his 100th ODI appearance.
 Most runs as wicketkeeper batsman in ODI history (13,262 runs) and the first wicketkeeper batsman to score over 10000 runs in One Day Internationals.

T20I records
 He along with Mahela Jayawardene holds the record for the highest ever partnership for any wicket in ICC World T20 history(166 for the 2nd wicket)
 He was the first batsman to score half centuries in 2 different ICC T20 World Cup finals(in 2009 and 2014)

Aggregate records
 Most runs in cricket in all formats of the game in a calendar year – Sangakkara scored 2868 runs in the year 2014. (1493 Tests + 1256 ODIs + 119 T20Is)
 Total runs scored in all forms of the game – Sangakkara is second only to Indian Sachin Tendulkar, scoring 28,016 international runs.
 Fourth in the list of most dismissals as wicketkeeper across all formats (678).

World Cups
 Most dismissals as wicketkeeper – Kumar Sangakkara (54) in 37 matches. He was also the second wicketkeeper after Adam Gilchrist to effect in 50+ dismissals in World Cups
 Fastest century by a Sri Lankan – Sangakkara scored his 23rd ODI century by 70 balls against England on 1 March 2015.
 Most consecutive centuries in a single World Cup (4). 
 First player to have scored 4 centuries in a single World Cup.

Player statistics

Centuries

Sangakkara has scored 38 centuries in Test cricket, more than any other Sri Lankan. Additionally, Sangakkara has scored 25 centuries in ODIs.

Awards

 Sir Garfield Sobers Trophy (ICC Cricketer of the Year): 2012
 ICC Test Player of the Year: 2012
 ICC ODI Player of the Year: 2011, 2013
 ICC Test Team of the Year:2006-2008, 2010–2012, 2014
 ICC ODI Team of the Year: 2011–2013, 2015
 Wisden Leading Cricketer in the World: 2011, 2014
 Wisden Cricketers of the Year: 2012
 LG People's Choice Award: 2011 & 2012
 Outstanding Achievement in Sport 2015, The Asian Awards.
 CEAT International Cricketer of the Year: 2015
 Ada Derana Sri Lankan of the Year 2016 – Icon of the Year Award
 Dialog SLC ODI Batsman of the Year: 2015

See also

 Mahela-Sanga Challenge Trophy

References

External links

 Official Website 
 
Kumara Sangakkara videos, photos and news
Kumar Sangakkara: The Gentleman Stylist Of Sri Lankan Cricket

1977 births
Living people
ACC Asian XI One Day International cricketers
ICC World XI One Day International cricketers
Nondescripts Cricket Club cricketers
Warwickshire cricketers
Sri Lanka One Day International cricketers
Sri Lanka Test cricketers
Sri Lanka Twenty20 International cricketers
Sri Lanka Test cricket captains
Punjab Kings cricketers
Sri Lankan terrorism victims
Sinhalese sportspeople
Sri Lankan Buddhists
Alumni of the University of Colombo
Cricketers at the 2003 Cricket World Cup
Cricketers at the 2007 Cricket World Cup
Cricketers at the 2011 Cricket World Cup
Cricketers at the 2015 Cricket World Cup
Alumni of Trinity College, Kandy
Kandurata cricketers
Wisden Leading Cricketers in the World
Wisden Cricketers of the Year
Cricketers from Kandy
Sunrisers Hyderabad cricketers
International Cricket Council Cricketer of the Year
Jamaica Tallawahs cricketers
Durham cricketers
Surrey cricketers
Quetta Gladiators cricketers
Karachi Kings cricketers
Deccan Chargers cricketers
Dhaka Dominators cricketers
Hobart Hurricanes cricketers
Multan Sultans cricketers
Sri Lankan cricket commentators
Wicket-keepers
Presidents of the Marylebone Cricket Club